The 1942–43 Indiana Hoosiers men's basketball team represented Indiana University. Their head coach was Branch McCracken, who was in his 5th and final year before taking a 3-year leave of absence to serve in the Navy during World War II. The team played its home games in The Fieldhouse in Bloomington, Indiana, and was a member of the Big Ten Conference.

The Hoosiers finished the regular season with an overall record of 18–2 and a conference record of 11–2, finishing 2nd in the Big Ten Conference. Indiana was not invited to participate in any postseason tournament.

Roster

Schedule/Results

|-
!colspan=8| Regular Season
|-

References

Indiana Hoosiers
Indiana Hoosiers men's basketball seasons
1942 in sports in Indiana
1943 in sports in Indiana